American R&B duo Chloe x Halle have released two studio albums, three extended plays, one mixtape, 11 singles and 13 music videos.

Albums

Studio albums

Extended plays

Mixtapes

Singles

As lead artist

As featured artist

Promotional singles

Guest appearances

Notes

References 

General sources
 

Discography
Rhythm and blues discographies
Discographies of American artists
Pop music group discographies